Fateh Singh better known by his stage name Fateh Doe or mononym Fateh is a Toronto-based Canadian rapper, singer and songwriter of Indian descent. His music career gained traction in 2012 when he began to work with Dr Zeus.

Early life and career
Fateh Singh was born on October 19, 1986, in Bangkok, Thailand to Indian Punjabi Sikh parents from Jalandhar, Punjab, India. At the age of six his family moved to Hayward, California, U.S. where he started listening to hip hop music. He attended John Muir Elementary School as a child and afterwards Hayward High School. Later his family relocated in Toronto, Ontario, Canada. Fateh began rapping in Canada and changed his name to Young Fateh and then to Fateh. Subsequently, he then changed his name to Fateh Doe. He released three mixtapes California State of Mind (2009), One Verse Curse (2010) and Mr Wall Street (2011). He also once tried to meet Dr Zeus at his concert in a nightclub in California so he could give him CDs of his mixtapes.Fateh gained popularity when he was discovered by Dr Zeus in 2012 through Jephin Varghese. He was featured in many tracks with Dr Zeus. He also joined the band "Zoo Babies" and was featured in the debut album of the band. Fateh was then approached by many other artists including Amrinder Gill, Jaz Dhami, The PropheC and Gippy Grewal. He has also sung the song "Lovely" from 2014 Bollywood film Happy New Year. In August 2015, he released his debut solo single ‘Naiyo Jaan De’. He had also received four nominations ‘Breakthrough Act’, ‘Best North American Act’, and ‘Best Urban Asian Act’ at 2015 Brit Asia Music Awards. In 2016 he also released his debut album "Bring It Home". Fateh released his fourth album on October 23, 2020, under the name "Goes Without Saying". On January 27, 2022, Fateh released his fifth studio album “Hate That I Love You”.

Discography

Mixtapes
California State of Mind (2009)
One Verse Curse (2010)
Mr. Wall Street (2011)

Albums
Bring It Home
To Whom It May Concern
New Memories
Goes Without Saying
Hate That I Love You

Singles
Raazi - JioSaavn AO (2019)
 Proud To Be Desi - Khan Bhaini (feat. Fateh) (2020)
Saahan - Aman Sarang (feat. Dr Zeus Shortie & Fateh Doe)
Rendeh - Saini Surinder (feat. Dr Zeus Shortie & Fateh Doe)
Age 22 - Navjeet Khalon (feat. Dr Zeus Shortie, Fateh Doe)
Mainu Single Rehna - Rajveer (feat. Dr Zeus & Fateh Doe)
We Just Wanna Party - Naywaan, Dr Zeus, Fateh Doe & DS
Pakka Sharabi - Rajveer (feat. Dr Zeus, Shortie, Fateh Doe)
Painkiller - Miss Pooja (feat. Dr Zeus & Fateh Doe)
Black Suit - Preet Harpal (feat. Dr Zeus & Fateh Doe)
Lovely Ho Gai aa - Kanika Kapoor (feat. Fateh Doe)
Inch - Zora Randawa (feat. Dr Zeus & Fateh Doe)
Pendu - Amrinder Gill (feat. Fateh Doe) 
Beparwaiyan Refix - Jaz Dhami (feat. Dr Zeus & Fateh Doe)
Black Til Girik Aman, Dr Zeus, Fateh Doe)
Show Match - Dilpreet Dhillon  (feat. Desi Crew and Fateh Doe)
Etwaar - Jazzy B (feat: Dr Zeus & Fateh Doe)
Shades Of Black - Gagan Kokri (feat: Heartbeat & Fateh Doe)
Network - Gav Masti (Feat. Dr Zeus & Fateh Doe)
Naiyo Jaan De - (Fateh Doe)
Pagal (Feat. Jus Reign)
Panga Remix (My Way) (Feat. Jus Reign)
22Da - Zora Randhawa (feat: Jay-K & Fateh Doe)
Dar Lagda - Raju Dinehwala (feat: Dr Zeus & Fateh Doe)
Body - Mickey Singh (feat: Fateh Doe)
Chete Karda 2 - Resham Singh Anmol (feat: Fateh Doe)
Nain - Pav Dharia 
Bamb Gaana - Jazzy B

See also
List of Canadian musicians
List of Indo-Canadians
List of people from California

References

External links

Living people
Canadian male singer-songwriters
Canadian singer-songwriters
Punjabi rappers
Canadian male rappers
Canadian people of Indian descent
Musicians from Bangkok
1986 births
21st-century Thai musicians
21st-century Canadian rappers
Canadian people of Punjabi descent
Punjabi singers
21st-century Canadian male musicians
Rappers from Toronto